Waingapu is the largest town in the eastern half of the island of Sumba, East Nusa Tenggara, Indonesia. It is the capital town of the Regency of Sumba Timur. The town (a district of the regency) had a population of 35,932 inhabitants at the official mid 2021 estimates.

Transportation
Sumba Timur's Waingapu Airport 'Umbu Mehang Kunda' (IATA: WGP - ICAO: WRRW) is located in Waingapu, and the town is served by ferries from nearby islands.

Climate
Waingapu has a hot semi-arid climate (Köppen BSh) with relatively cooler dry season and hotter wet season. It has high humidity year round. It is the driest place in Indonesia with only  of rain yearly.

References

External links
 Waingapu.Com
 Official Sumba Timur Website on Waingapu
 Blie.Info Top Places In East Sumba

Populated places in East Nusa Tenggara
Port cities and towns in Indonesia
Geography of Sumba
Regency seats of East Nusa Tenggara